The 2019 Kogi State gubernatorial election occurred on 16 November 2019. Incumbent APC Governor Yahaya Bello won re-election for a second term, defeating PDP Musa Wada and several minor party candidates.

Yahaya Bello emerged as the APC gubernatorial candidate after scoring 3,091 votes and defeating his closest rival, Babatunde Irukera, who received 109 votes. He picked Edward David Onoja as his running mate. Musa Wada was the PDP candidate with Samuel Aro as his running mate. 23 candidates contested in the election.

Electoral system
The Governor of Kogi State is elected using the plurality voting system.

Primary election

APC primary
The APC primary election was held on August 29, 2019. Yahaya Bello won the primary election polling 3,091 votes against 9 other candidates. His closet rival was Babatunde Irukera, a chief executive of the Federal Competition and Consumer Protection Commission who came second with 109 votes, while Hassan Abdullahi Baiwa, member house of representatives came third with 44 votes.

Candidates
Party nominee: Yahaya Bello: incumbent governor
Running mate: Edward David Onoja: incumbent deputy governor
Babatunde Irukera: chief executive of the Federal Competition and Consumer Protection Commission
Hassan Abdullahi Baiwa: House of Representatives member
Yahaya Odidi Audi
Sani Lulu Abdullahi
Abubakar Bashir
Yakubu Mohammed
Hadiza Ibrahim
Danlami Umar Mohammed
Ikele Aisha Blessing

PDP primary
The PDP primary election was held on September 3, 2019. Musa Wada won the primary election polling 748 votes against 4 other candidates. His closest rival Ibrahim Abubakar came second with 710 votes, Idris Wada, a former governor came third with 345 votes, while Dino Melaye, a Nigerian senator polled 70 votes.

Candidates
Party nominee: Musa Wada
Running mate: Samuel Aro: former member of house of representatives
Ibrahim Abubakar
Idris Wada: former governor
Dino Melaye: Nigerian senator

Results
A total number of 23 candidates registered with the Independent National Electoral Commission to contest in the election.

The total number of registered voters in the state was 1,646,350, while 636,202 voters were accredited. Total number of votes cast was 624,514, while number of valid votes was 610,744. Rejected votes were 13,770.

By local government area
Here are the results of the election by local government area for the two major parties. The total valid votes of 610,744 represents the 23 political parties that participated in the election. Blue represents LGAs won by Yahaya Bello. Green represents LGAs won by Musa Wada.

References 

Kogi
Kogi State gubernatorial elections
Kogi State gubernatorial election
2019 Kogi State elections